Rob Evans (also known as Robert Evans and Robert Alan Evans) born 14 March 1978 is a playwright.

Early life
Born in Oxford, UK, he grew up in Penarth, Vale of Glamorgan in South Wales. He studied for an MA in English Literature and History at the University of Edinburgh before moving to Glasgow in 2000 where he began writing professionally for theatre.

Play writing
After working as Assistant Director at the Traverse Theatre, Edinburgh on Gagarin Way by Gregory Burke and Iron by Rona Munro, Evans was sent to Townsville, Australia by the Traverse to take part in World Interplay, a worldwide conference for young playwrights. There his first play A Girl in a Car with a Man was picked up by playwright Simon Stephens and subsequently produced at the Royal Court Theatre in 2004 for which actor Andrew Scott subsequently received the 2005 Laurence Olivier Award for Outstanding Achievement in an Affiliate Theatre for his portrayal of Alex.

His work with People Can Run theatre company led to the writing of Aruba which, after a successful run at the Edinburgh Fringe Festival went on to tour the UK and play off Broadway.

His work for young people includes Pinocchio (Northampton Theatre Royal); Kappa, an adaptation of Ben Rice's short story Pobby and Dingan, an adaptation of Barry Hines’ Kes and The Ballad of Pondlife McGurk for Catherine Wheels Theatre Company; Peter Pan for the Sherman Cymru; Mikey and Addie for London 2012 Festival.

Radio
His radio play The Cracks was broadcast on BBC Radio 4 on Monday 6 September 2010.
His abridgement of A Patriot for Us by John Helpern was broadcast on 8 May 2006.

Awards
He was nominated for the Brian Way Award for The Ballad of Pondlife McGurk. 
He is the winner of the 2010 TMA Award for Best show for Children and Young people for Pobby and Dingan.

Publication
His work in the UK is published by Faber and Faber, Samuel French and Oberon and in France by L'Arche (éditeur).

External links
 Website: http://www.nationaltheatreofrob.co.uk
 Agent: http://www.casarotto.co.uk/client/rob-evans-12614
 Theatre Scotland: http://www.theatrescotland.com/Scottish-theatre-artists/Playwrights/E.html
 Doolee: http://www.doollee.com/PlaywrightsE/evans-rob.html#146604

Sources
 TMA Award: http://www.tmauk.org/newsandpress/Article.aspx?article=421
 Faber and Faber: http://www.faber.co.uk/catalog/a-girl-in-a-car-with-a-man/9780571227174
 Samuel French: https://samuelfrench-london.co.uk/frenchs-acting-editions/titles-come
 l'Arche (editeur): http://www.arche-editeur.com/publications-catalogue.php?livre=597
 London 2012 Festival: http://www.imaginate.org.uk/FESTIVAL/shows/mikeyandaddie.php
 Brian Way Award nomination: http://blogs.thestage.co.uk/education/2011/04/keith-sahas-ghost-boy-wins-top-award/
 http://www.heraldscotland.com/arts-ents/stage-visual-arts/kes-soars-on-stage-1.1124318
 https://www.telegraph.co.uk/culture/3632661/Tantalising-journey-through-a-nightmare.html
 http://www.schaubuehne.de/de_DE/program/repertoire/9142
 Swedish production of Pondlife McGurk http://www.mittiprickteatern.se/show.php?showId=83
 German agent: http://www.rowohlt-theaterverlag.de/theater/magazin/335105
 http://www.radiolistings.co.uk/programmes/p/pa/patriot_for_us__a.html
 http://www.spectator.co.uk/arts/22115/honest-john/
 http://www.thestage.co.uk/reviews/review.php/37815/peter-pan

References

Living people
Alumni of the University of Edinburgh
People from Penarth
1978 births
Welsh male dramatists and playwrights